The Rhaetian Alps are a mountain range of the Eastern Alps. The SOIUSA classification system divides them into the Western and Eastern Rhaetian Alps, while the Alpine Club classification of the Eastern Alps places most of the Rhaetian subranges within the Western Limestone Alps.

They are located along the Italian–Swiss and Austrian–Swiss borders, in the canton of Graubünden in eastern Switzerland; in the state of Tyrol in Austria; and in the Italian regions of Trentino-Alto Adige and Lombardy.

The name relates to a Roman province and the Rhaetian people subdued under Emperor Augustus in 15 BC.

Geography
The Rhaetian Alps contain these subranges:
Albula Range
Bernina Range
Brenta group
Bregaglia Range
Ortler Alps
Rätikon
Silvretta

The Swiss National Park is located in the Western Rhaetian Alps.

See also
Limestone Alps
Southern Limestone Alps
Central Eastern Alps
 The Rhaetian Age which ends the Triassic Period of geological time is named for the Rhaetian Alps.

References 

 
Mountain ranges of the Alps
Southern Limestone Alps
Mountain ranges of Italy
Mountain ranges of Switzerland
Mountain ranges of Graubünden
Mountain ranges of Lombardy
Mountain ranges of Trentino
Mountain ranges of Tyrol (state)